The 2019 Copa Ecuador was the first edition of the Copa Ecuador, Ecuador's domestic football cup. It began with the first round on 10 November 2018 and concluded with its double-legged final on 10 and 16 November 2019. LDU Quito were the winners, beating Delfín on away goals after tying 3–3 on aggregate score. They would have qualified for the 2020 Copa Sudamericana, but since they had already qualified for international competition through their league performance as well as the runners-up and both semifinalists, the berth was reallocated to the ninth-placed team of the league, El Nacional.

Format 
The competition involved 48 teams and was divided into seven rounds. The first round was played by 22 teams from the provincial associations (20 provincial champions and 2 invitees) and 2 amateur teams, which were drawn into 12 two-legged ties. The 12 winners qualified for the second round, where they were drawn into six two-legged ties with the winners advancing to the third round.

In the third round, the six winners from the previous round were joined by the 16 Serie A and 10 Serie B teams, who played in 16 two-legged ties with the winners advancing to the round of 16, from where the competition advanced to the quarterfinals, semifinals, and final.

Prizes 
The champions of this edition earned the right to compete in the 2020 Copa Sudamericana, taking the Ecuador 4 berth. In case the champions were already qualified for the Copa Libertadores or Copa Sudamericana through their league performance, the berth would be transferred to the runners-up, the semifinalists, or the next best team of the league not yet qualified for either competition.

Schedule

Teams 
48 clubs took part in this edition of the Copa Ecuador: 16 from the Serie A, 8 from the Serie B, 20 from the Segunda Categoría, 2 amateur teams and Deportivo Quito and Everest, both invited by the Ecuadorian Football Federation based on their historical records.

Serie A

 América de Quito
 Aucas
 Barcelona
 Delfín
 Deportivo Cuenca
 El Nacional
 Emelec
 Fuerza Amarilla
 Guayaquil City
 Independiente del Valle
 LDU Quito
 Macará
 Mushuc Runa
 Olmedo
 Técnico Universitario
 Universidad Católica

Serie B

 Clan Juvenil
 Gualaceo
 LDU Loja
 LDU Portoviejo
 Manta
 Orense
 Puerto Quito
 Santa Rita

Segunda Categoría

 Águilas
 Alianza Cotopaxi
 Alianza de Guano
 América de Ambato
 Anaconda
 Atlético Portoviejo
 Audaz Octobrino
 Brasilia
 Chicos Malos
 Deportivo Morona
 Dunamis
 Duros del Balón
 ESPOLI
 Imbabura
 Insutec
 La Gloria
 Mineros
 San Francisco
 Toreros
 Valle Catamayo

Amateur teams

 San Pedro
 Spartak

Invited teams

 Deportivo Quito
 Everest

Notes:

First round
Teams entering this round: 20 teams from Segunda Categoría, 2 amateur teams and 2 invited teams.

|-
!colspan=5|West Zone

|-
!colspan=5|East Zone

|}

Source: FEF

Second round

|-
!colspan=5|West Zone

|-
!colspan=5|East Zone

|}

Source: FEF

Note: Deportivo Quito qualified for the third round, however they were excluded from the competition due to their suspension for failing to pay its creditors. They were replaced by Mineros, as the next best team in the aggregate table of the competition.

Third round
The third round of the competition was held from 24 April to 19 June 2019, with teams in Serie A and Serie B entering at this stage. The draw for this stage of the competition was held on 2 April 2019.

|}

Bracket

Round of 16

|}

Quarterfinals

|}

Semifinals

|}

Finals

Tied 3–3 on aggregate, LDU Quito won on away goals.

Top goalscorers

Source: FEF

References

External links
Copa Ecuador on the Ecuadorian Football Federation website 

Ecuador
2019 in Ecuadorian football